LOGINventory is an agentless network inventory tool written by Schmidt's LOGIN GmbH. LOGINventory is compatible with Vista, Windows 7, Windows 8, Windows 10, Windows Server 2008 and Windows Server 2012 including 64Bit versions.

Functionality
LOGINventory collects the data of all networked Windows computers as well as the information of other SNMP-capable devices. Among these are print servers, hubs, routers, switches, Linux and Mac computers. LOGINventory works agentless by using the existings APIs and is integrated into Microsoft Management Console

History
The tool hit the market with version 3 in January 2002. Since then it was continuously improved and is available in English and German languages. In March 2016 LOGINventory7 was launched. Version 7 was especially developed with regards to inventory virtualized infrastructures.

Licensing
LOGINventory is free for up to 20 PCs. Commercial versions are available for networks with more than 20 assets.

References
 Review on TechWorld
 Review on Download.com

External links
 Official website of LOGINventory
 Support Forum (English/German)

Internet Protocol based network software
System administration